Newsbeat is the BBC's radio news programme broadcast on Radio 1, 1Xtra and Asian Network. Newsbeat is produced by BBC News but differs from the BBC's other news programmes in its remit to provide news tailored for young people.

The fifteen-minute Newsbeat programme is broadcast at 12:45 and 17:45 during the week on Radio 1, 1Xtra and Asian Network. Short bulletins are also heard throughout the day on three stations on the half-hour with extra bulletins broadcast at peak times.

History
BBC Radio 1's remit as a public service broadcaster meant it had to broadcast news. Newsbeat was launched on 10 September 1973 in response to the launch of a network of commercial radio stations across the UK which supplied a news service very different from the style of traditional BBC News. The programme's first presenter was the Radio 1 DJ Ed Stewart and he was succeeded by Laurie Mayer and Richard Skinner.

Although unconfirmed by the BBC, it is widely thought that the name "Newsbeat" was taken from the Radio Caroline news service of the same name, as was the concept of short bulletins on the half-hour. Caroline first used the name (and broadcast half-hourly headlines) in the 1960s. Roger Gale, who had previously worked on Radio Caroline North, was one of the show's first producers. The launch editor was Mike Chaney.

Until the start of the 21st century, the Newsbeat brand was only used for the 15-minute lunchtime and teatime bulletins  as all other news bulletins, which were always broadcast at half-past the hour, were branded as Radio 1 News. Also, for the first four years of the 1990s, Newsbeat was only broadcast at lunchtime as the evening bulletin was a 30-minute programme called News 90/91/92/93.

Following changes in September 2012, the vast majority of Newsbeat bulletins are simulcast on both BBC Radio 1 and 1Xtra. Previously, bulletins on 1Xtra were bespoke and branded as '1Xtra News', with bulletins on the half-hour (as with Newsbeat), but with 15 minute programmes at 12:30 and 5:30, a quarter of an hour before the Radio 1 equivalents. Each station continues to have bespoke bulletins during the weekday breakfast show, before shared bulletins begin at 10:30.

Newsbeat won Gold for Best News & Current Affairs Programme at the Radio Academy Awards on 13 May 2013.

It is believed that BBC World Service will pilot a global edition of Newsbeat, a bulletin aimed on the station aimed at younger listeners.

Newsbeat's The Story of Izzy Dix was named Podcast of the Year at the UK ARIAS 2016. Newsbeat also won Best News Coverage at the awards in 2021.

In 2021 it was announced Newsbeat will relocate to Birmingham, signalling the departure of many on air staff and editor Debbie Ramsay. The move is due to take place in the Autumn of 2022.

Bulletins

Newsbeat has short bulletins broadcast on Radio 1 and 1Xtra (Asian Network was added and merged due to staff shortages, as well as the BBC wanting to streamline news during the COVID-19 pandemic) throughout the day, as well as the 12:45 and 17:45 main programmes. These are simulcast, following budget cuts that came into effect in September 2012. Prior to this, weekend news bulletins had been simulcast for quite some time. Additionally, at this time, the number of bulletins was cut back somewhat, dropping the news at 04:30 and 05:30 during the Early Breakfast show on weekdays. There also used to be bulletins at midnight, which were stopped at some point prior to this. They are read by one newsreader, but in the past there would be a news reader and a sport reader during breakfast and drivetime bulletins on weekdays and breakfast bulletins at weekends. Bulletins are usually 2–3 minutes in length, and feature news and some sports stories, and weather during the breakfast show bulletins.

The format of Newsbeat bulletins varies throughout the day. Breakfast updates consist of full news, sport and weather; throughout the day it will be only the news and some notable sports stories. The 13:30 bulletin is notable for being read by a different newsreader every day due to the main newsreader being on lunch at that time. Popular folklore says that the last person remaining in the Newsbeat office at lunchtime has to read the 13:30 bulletin. Full sport updates begin at 15:30. Bulletins are more scaled back at weekends, with brief stories and sport during every bulletin throughout the day, and one newsreader reading the news for the whole day.

There was also an entertainment news round up at approximately 07:40 and 09:40 during The Radio 1 Breakfast Show with Nick Grimshaw, often hosted by Sinead Garvan. This continued when Nick moved to drivetime with one bulletin at 16:40. Entertainment news slots at 12:00 during Jo Whiley's weekday mid-morning, later Fearne Cotton's mid-morning show and at 18:30 during Greg James' show were dropped in 2015.

Until March 2020, breakfast bulletins used to be broadcast to one station (i.e. one for Radio 1 and then one for 1Xtra). Now they are all simulcast from 6.30 am right until 5.45 pm. The 6.30 am bulletin used to just be on Radio 1, however from September 2020, it is simulcast across Radio 1, 1Xtra and Asian Network.

In November 2017, the 16:30 bulletin on weekdays was shortened and the 17:00 bulletin dropped altogether. In addition, the 22:00 bulletin was brought forward to 21:00, and the 16:30 and 17:30 bulletins on Saturdays were also dropped. The 21:00 bulletin was dropped in 2020 due to the COVID-19 pandemic.

As of October 2021 the main Newsbeat has been dropped from BBC Asian Network on Monday to Thursday afternoons from 3pm. Three-minute bulletins are broadcast at 15:00, 15:30, 16:00, 16:30, 17:00, 17:30 and 17:57.  This is hosted by a different presenter to BBC Radio 1 and 1 Xtra.

On Friday afternoons, the BBC Asian Network broadcasts the network Newsbeat bulletins at 15:30 and 16:30 plus the full 17:45 Newsbeat programme.

The current bulletin times are as follows:

Bank holidays follow a weekend bulletin schedule. Weekdays during the Christmas and New Year period follow a weekend bulletin schedule with the addition of bulletins at 16:30 and 17:30. Bulletins on Christmas Day are hourly from 08:30 to 12:30.

Location
In keeping with its specific targeting of young audiences, Newsbeat had its own set of reporters and studios based at Radio 1 in Broadcasting House in London. Since 2022, the programme is based at The Mailbox in Birmingham, as part of the BBC's effort to move some of its services outside of London. 

Many of the stories produced by Newsbeat are reported by other programmes across BBC News.

Newsreaders and reporters
There are various presenters and reporters on Newsbeat including Roisin Hastie, who took over from Tina Daheley as newsreader on Radio 1 Breakfast with Greg James and Ben Mundy who took over from Chris Smith as the main host of the 1245 and 1745 programmes in August 2018. Various presenters below, have additional roles.

Editors

Danielle Dwyer (Editor)
Ben Mundy (Assistant Editor)

Main presenters

Calum Leslie (Breakfast newsreader)
Pria Rai (Afternoon newsreader and programme presenter)

Programme producers

Daniel Rosney (weekend newsreader, politics editor)

On air reporters

Gurvinder Gill (cover presenter and weekend newsreader)
Jordan Kenny (cover presenter, weekend newsreader)
Rick Kelsey (seasonal cover presenter)
Betty Glover (sports reporter)
Sam Gruet
Megan Lawton
Mitch Mansfield
Jack Gray
Rachel Stonehouse
Charlotte Simpson
Pete Allison

Online and digital reporters

Michael Baggs
Manish Pandey

Previous reporters and main presenters include Eleanor Oldroyd, Carolyn Atkinson, Claire Bradley, Tina Daheley, Claire Cavanagh, Dominic Byrne, Georgina Bowman, Anna Foster, Tulip Mazumdar, Chris Smith, Declan Harvey, Ben Mundy, Christian Hewgill and Sinead Garvan.

Previous sports reporters include Arlo White, Andy May, Simon Mundie, Mark Chapman, David Garrido, Juliette Ferrington, Tina Daheley and Carrie Davis.

There is a long-running tradition of the DJ on air at the time chatting to the newsreader following their bulletin. Chris Moyles, often shamelessly flirted with the female newsreaders for bad comic effect, and built up a good on-air relationship with afternoon newsreader Dominic Byrne, who later went on to join him on the BBC Radio 1 and Radio X breakfast shows. Greg James also built a good relationship with Chris Smith through chatting following news bulletins.

Editors
Danielle Dwyer was appointed editor of Newsbeat in October 2021. She will oversee the programme's move from London, to Birmingham in Autumn 2022. Newsbeat's bulletins and programming is due to air from Birmingham as from the Autumn of 2022. The Newsbeat editor also oversees BBC Asian Network news, as well as all Newsbeat output across BBC Radio 1, 1Xtra, BBC iPlayer and online.

Debbie Ramsay was Newsbeat's previous editor. She left Newsbeat in 2021 having been in charge since 2016.  Newsbeat's executive editor was former daytime editor of BBC Radio 5 Live and editor of the Victoria Derbyshire programme on BBC Two and the BBC News Channel Louisa Compton until 2018.

Rod McKenzie, himself was a former presenter of the programme and the news presenter on the Simon Mayo Breakfast Show on Radio 1 from 1988 to 1993, and was an editor until 2014, when he was dismissed from the station moved to another position job within the BBC after bullying allegations.

Newsbeat'''s first editor was Mike Chaney - hired from The Sun by the Director-General to inject a populist flavour to the news coverage of Radio 1.

Imaging

Newsbeat is notable for the distinctive musical imaging it has used for most of its history. At first, this was a just jingle at the beginning of the bulletin, but in the late 1990s this expanded to music throughout. There are different beds for news, sport and weather. The news imaging used to be changed every year, but this changed to every two years in 2005, and the most recent imaging package was on air from 2017-2022.

Newsbeat's Oddbox
In 2007, Newsbeat's Oddbox was launched. A four-minute video which looked at the week's strangest news, it was presented by Dominic Byrne, or by Tulip Mazumdar or Natalie Jamieson when Byrne was unavailable. Old episodes are available to watch at BBC Online, on the BBC Red Button and on the BBC News channel. The last episode of Oddbox was released on 14 September 2012, to coincide with Byrne leaving Radio 1.

Parody
Satirist and broadcaster Christopher Morris parodied the 1990s presentational style of Newsbeat as "Radio 1 Newsbanger". Some of these parodies were actually broadcast on Radio 1, though most featured in the Radio 4 comedy series On The Hour.

In 1997, Morris further parodied Newsbeat by rearranging sentences of existing Newsbeat broadcasts to create nonsensical and blackly comic headlines, as part of a one-off segment on Blue Jam. Unlike On The Hour, Blue Jam'' was broadcast on Radio 1.

References

External links
 
 
 A different Newsbeat BBC Blogs, 17 November 2007 - A history of Newsbeat, written by former editor Rod McKenzie
 BBC Odd Box Listing of Oddbox episodes

BBC news radio programmes
BBC Radio 1 programmes
1973 radio programme debuts